Macauley Hallett (born 27 November 1995) is a English rugby league footballer who plays as  for Midlands Hurricanes in the RFL League 1.

Background
Hallett was born in Kingston upon Hull, Humberside.

Playing career
A former West Hull junior, Macauley is a product of a Hull Kingston Rovers scholarship. On 27 May 2014, he signed a two-year contract extension. He played in the centre and was the youngest player of Hull Kingston Rovers' first team before his transfer from Hull Kingston Rovers to Swinton Lions in late October 2015. He was a trialist a Featherstone Rovers.

References

External links
Profile at dewsburyrams.co.uk

1995 births
Living people
Batley Bulldogs players
Dewsbury Rams players
English rugby league players
English rugby union players
Hull Kingston Rovers players
Hunslet R.L.F.C. players
Keighley Cougars players
Newcastle Thunder players
Rugby league centres
Rugby league players from Kingston upon Hull
Rugby league wingers
Swinton Lions players